Tempozan Ferris Wheel is a 112 meter tall ferris wheel located in Osaka, Japan, at Tempozan Harbor Village, next to Osaka Aquarium Kaiyukan, one of the largest aquariums in the world.

Description
Tempozan Ferris Wheel opened to the public on July 12, 1997, and was then the tallest Ferris wheel in the world. During the 17-minute ride it offers a view of Osaka Bay and surrounding areas, including Mount Ikoma to the east, Akashi Kaikyō Bridge to the west, Kansai International Airport to the south, and the Rokko Mountains to the north.

The wheel has  colored lights that provide a weather forecast for the next day. Orange lights indicate a sunny day, green lights a cloudy day and blue lights indicate rain.

The Daikanransha Ferris wheel at Palette Town in Odaiba, Tokyo, which opened in 1999, has the same diameter as Tempozan, but 2.5 metres more in total height. Sky Dream Fukuoka opened in 2002 and has a diameter of 112 metres and a total height of 120 metres, but ceased operating in September 2009. The Diamond and Flower Ferris Wheel at Kasai Rinkai Park, east of Tokyo, opened in 2001 and has a diameter of 111 metres and a  height of 117 metres.

See also
 Akashi Kaikyō Bridge
 World's tallest Ferris wheels

References

External links

Tourist attractions in Osaka
Ferris wheels in Japan
Buildings and structures in Osaka
1997 establishments in Japan